Katherine or Catherine Wilson  may refer to:

Catherine Wilson (1822–1862), British woman hanged for murder
Catherine Wilson (philosopher), British philosopher
Katherine Austen (née Wilson; 1629–c.1683), writer
Katherine Sheppard (née Wilson; 1848–1934), suffragette in New Zealand
Marie Wilson (American actress) (Katherine Elisabeth Wilson; 1916–1972), American radio, film actress

See also
Kate Wilson (disambiguation)
Wilson (surname)